Don't Talk to Strangers may refer to:

 Don't Talk to Strangers (film), a 1994 TV film
 "Don't Talk to Strangers" (The Beau Brummels song), 1965
 "Don't Talk to Strangers" (Rick Springfield song), 1982
 "Don't Talk to Strangers" (Hedley song), 2009
 "Don't Talk to Strangers", a song by Dio, from the album Holy Diver